Cosmopterix turbidella is a moth of the family Cosmopterigidae. It is known from the Canary Islands.

The wingspan is 7–8 mm.

The larvae feed on Forsskalea angustifolia, Gesnouinia arborea, Parietaria debilis and Parietaria officinalis. They mine the leaves of their host plant. The mine starts as a corridor that runs from the midrib in the direction of the leaf margin, following a lateral vein. Later, the corridor widens into an irregular blotch. Most frass is ejected through a hole in the first section of the mine. Much of the frass grains are captured by spinning under the leaf. A single larva makes several mines.

References

turbidella